Kanye West Presents: Good Music – Cruel Summer, commonly referred to simply as Cruel Summer, is a compilation album by recording artists of American record label GOOD Music, released on September 14, 2012, by the label and Def Jam Recordings. American rapper Kanye West, head of the label, first revealed plans for a label collaborative album in October 2011. The album produced four singles—"Mercy", "Cold", "New God Flow", and "Clique"—that charted on the US Billboard Hot 100. The album features West himself, alongside GOOD Music signees Pusha T, Big Sean, Teyana Taylor, Cyhi the Prynce, Kid Cudi, John Legend, Common, D'banj and Malik Yusef, as well as affiliates 2 Chainz, Jay-Z and Travis Scott, among others. Production on the album was primarily handled by members of GOOD Music's production wing, Very GOOD Beats, including West, Hit-Boy, Hudson Mohawke, Travis Scott and Lifted, among others.

Cruel Summer received "a fairly lukewarm response" from critics who commended its hubristic style and the tracks featuring West, but found it uneven as an album. It debuted at number two on the US Billboard 200, selling 205,000 copies in its first week. The album also reached the top 10 of charts in Australia, Canada, Switzerland, and the United Kingdom. As of November 4, 2012, Cruel Summer has sold 389,000 copies, according to Nielsen SoundScan.

Background and recording
Kanye West founded the GOOD Music label in 2004. Since the label's inception, multiple acts have been signed to the label, including close collaborators of West such as Kid Cudi, Common, John Legend, Pusha T, Big Sean and Travi$ Scott. West first announced plans for a GOOD Music album in October 2011 via his Twitter account. Later on May 23, 2012, the title was revealed in part with a film, Cruel Summer, written by Elon Rutberg and produced by Alex Rosenberg, which debuted at the Cannes Film Festival. The album was originally slated for release on August 7, 2012, but underwent several delays.

Pusha T said that he recorded over 20 verses for the album, and a song with Big Sean and Common called "Trash Bags" that was ultimately scrapped. American rapper Azealia Banks also said that she recorded with West earlier in 2012, but her contributions were not included on the album.

Release 
Cruel Summer was made available to pre-order on the website of the Japanese branch of retail chain HMV on September 1, 2012, revealing the album's track listing as well as each track's respective performers. The album's artwork was designed by DONDA, West's creative agency.

Singles
"Mercy", a collaboration between Kanye West, Big Sean, Pusha T and 2 Chainz, was released as the album's lead single on April 3, 2012. The track was premiered by Funkmaster Flex's Hot 97 radio show and was released onto the Internet the following day onto West's official website. The release of the track continued West's GOOD Fridays, a music giveaway that provided free MP3 downloads every week, which had been on hiatus since December 2010. The song peaked at number 13 on the US Billboard Hot 100 and topped the Billboard Hot R&B/Hip-Hop Songs and Hot Rap Songs charts.

"Cold", featuring DJ Khaled, was released as the album's second single. The track was then released as a single onto iTunes on April 17, 2012. Following its digital release, the song impacted urban contemporary radio on May 8, 2012. The single peaked at numbers 89 and 69 respectively on the Billboard Hot 100 and Hot R&B/Hip-Hop Songs singles charts.

"New God Flow", a collaboration between Pusha T and Kanye West, was released onto iTunes as the album's third single on July 21, 2012. It first premiered at the 2012 BET Awards on July 2, 2012, with West performing an a cappella version of his verse. The song peaked at number 89 on the Billboard Hot 100. "Clique", a collaboration between Kanye West, Jay-Z and Big Sean, was released as the album's fourth single on September 7, 2012. The single peaked at numbers 12 and 2 respectively on the Billboard Hot 100 and Hot R&B/Hip-Hop Songs singles charts.

Critical reception 

Cruel Summer received "a fairly lukewarm response" from critics. At Metacritic, which assigns a normalized rating out of 100 to reviews from mainstream publications, the album received an average score of 68, based on 28 reviews. Christopher R. Weingarten of Spin felt that it is "not a cohesive crew album" and called it "a runway show of small, costly, uncomfortable missteps." Nathan Rabin, writing in The A.V. Club, said that it "feels like an unusually crowded solo album, but West’s affiliates don’t share his gift for fusing self-aggrandizement with soul-searching reflection." Slant Magazine's Ted Scheinman observed no "concept or production value to hold" the album, which he felt "isn't a Kanye album per se, but even as a high-pedigree compilation, it still falls flat."

Jon Caramanica of The New York Times complimented the album's four singles for "show[ing] [West] at or near his best", but found GOOD Music's other rappers to be "a mixed bag". Jonah Weiner of Rolling Stone called the album "occasionally exhilarating, ultimately underwhelming", and observed "no grand statements, but plenty of hot lines", with West as "the star ... who bum-rushes every song he's on like it's someone else's acceptance speech". The magazine later named it the 24th best record of 2012 in a year-end list.

Adam Fleischer from XXL felt the songs featuring West were Cruel Summers highlights. Andy Gill of The Independent viewed it as less "ambitious" than West's own albums and said the songs "may lack grandeur, but they bring a sinister, stalking ambience that matches the blend of money, mystery and menace in the contributions of collaborators". Paul MacInnes of The Guardian wrote that his "penchant for superabundance is one of the most  things in pop music." Priya Elan of NME felt that the album is "essential" as "a cross section of the most brilliant, solipsistic mind in rap". MSN Music critic Robert Christgau was less enthusiastic and said the rapping is clever but plagued by a "Conspicuous Consumption Equals Authentic Negritude" philosophy, although he was impressed by the music: "The surprise is that the attention requires so little effort, because there's always a musical touch to keep you alert". The album received nominations for World's Best Album at the 2014 World Music Awards and Best Group Album at the 2012 XXL Awards

Commercial performance 
The album debuted at number two on the US Billboard 200, selling 205,000 copies in its first week. It also entered at number one on the Billboard Top R&B/Hip-Hop Albums. In its second week the album dropped to seventh, selling 55,000.

Cruel Summer debuted at number four on the Canadian Albums Chart, with first-week sales of 12,000 copies in Canada. As of November 4, 2012, Cruel Summer has sold 389,000 copies, according to Nielsen SoundScan.

As of 2020, Cruel Summer is tied with Shady XV as the second-best performing record label compilation album on Billboards  year-end Compilation albums chart, behind Eminem Presents: The Re-Up (3) in 2007, since records began in 2006.

Track listing

Notes
 Track listing and credits from album booklet
  signifies a co-producer.
  signifies an additional producer.
 
 "Clique" features background vocals by Cocaine 80s, Aude Cardona and Travis Jones.
 "The Morning" features additional vocals by Andrea Martin.
 "Cold.1" features outro vocals by DJ Pharris.
 "Higher" features background vocals by John Legend and 2 Chainz.
 "Sin City" features additional vocals by Cocaine 80s.
 "Don't Like.1" features additional vocals by Noah Goldstein.

Sample credits
 "Mercy" contains samples of the recording "Dust a Sound Boy", written by Denzie Beagle and Winston Riley, and performed by Super Beagle; samples of the recording "Cu-Oonuh", written by Reggie Williams and Winston Riley, and performed by Reggie Stepper; portions of the recording "Lambo", performed by YB; and a sample of "Tony's Theme", composed by Giorgio Moroder.
 "New God Flow" contains samples of the recording "Synthetic Substitution", written by Herb Rooney, and performed by Melvin Bliss; samples of the recording "Mighty Healthy", written by Herb Rooney, Ronald Bean, Highleigh Crizoe and Dennis Coles, and performed by Ghostface Killah; a sample of the Reverend G. I. Townsend recording "Sermon Fragment", written and performed by Townsend; and samples from the recording "Bôdas De Sangue", written and performed by Marcos Valle.
 "The Morning" contains portions of "Get Me to the Church on Time", written and performed by Alan Jay Lerner and Frederick Loewe.
 "Cold" contains interpolations of "Illegal Search", written by James T. Smith and Marlon L. Williams, and performed by LL Cool J; and "Lookin' at Me" by Mase.
 "The One" contains samples of the recording "Public Enemy No. 1", written by Carlton Ridenhour and James Boxley, and performed by Public Enemy; and samples of the recording "Double Barrel", written by Dave Barker, Winston Riley, and Ansell George Collins, and performed by Dave and Ansell Collins.
 "Don't Like" contains elements of "Under Mi Sensi", written and performed by Barrington Levy and Paul Love.

Personnel 
Credits for Cruel Summer adapted from Allmusic.

 2 Chainz – primary artist
 Virgil Abloh – creative director
 Marsha Ambrosius – primary artist, vocals
 Chris Atlas – marketing
 Craig Balmoris – producer
 Daniel Betancourt – engineer
 Big Sean – primary artist
 Dan Black – producer
 Tommy Brown – producer
 Mano – producer
 Don C. – A&R
 Guido Callarelli – art direction
 Jim Caruana –  assistant, engineer
 Chief Keef – primary artist
 Common – primary artist
 D'Banj – primary artist
 Mike Dean – additional production, keyboards, mixing
 DJ Khaled – primary artist
 DJ Pharris – vocals
 The-Dream – primary artist
 James Fauntleroy II – vocals
 Mannie Fresh – producer
 Ghostface Killah – primary artist
 Noah Goldstein – engineer, keyboards, mastering, mixing, vocals
 Hit-Boy – producer
 Hudson Mohawke – musician, producer
 Jadakiss – primary artist
 Jay-Z – primary artist
 Doug Joswick – package production
 R. Kelly – engineer, primary artist
 Kid Cudi – primary artist
 Anthony Kilhoffer – additional production, engineer, keyboards, mastering, mixing, musician, producer, sound effects
 Rob Kinelski – engineer
 John Legend – background vocals, primary artist

 Ken Lewis – additional production, engineer
 Andrea Martin – vocals
 Mase – primary artist
 Ian Mereness – engineer
 Fabien Montique – photography
 Julian Nixon – producer
 Oakwud – producer
 Keith Parry – mixing assistant
 Richard Parry – assistant
 Joe Perez – graphic design
 Che Pope – A&R, executive producer, programming
 Cyhi da Prynce – primary artist
 Pusha T – primary artist
 Raekwon – primary artist
 Patrick "Plain Pat" Reynolds – A&R
 Montez Roberts – engineer
 Todd Russell – art producer
 Bart Schoudel – engineer
 Travi$ Scott – primary artist, producer
 Nael Shehade – engineer
 Rob Suchecki – assistant
 Bill Sullivan – engineer
 Teyana Taylor – primary artist
 Scott Townsend – art producer
 Twilite Tone – additional production, producer
 Anna Ugarte – assistant
 Andrew "Pop" Wansel – producer
 Kanye West – additional production, creative director, executive producer, primary artist, producer
 Kristen Yiengst – art producer
 Young Chop – producer
 Malik Yusef – primary artist
 Izvor Zivkovic – management
 Luis Tarin - photography

Charts

Weekly charts

Year-end charts

Certifications

Release history

References

External links 
 

2012 compilation albums
Albums produced by Hit-Boy
Albums produced by Hudson Mohawke
Albums produced by Kanye West
Albums produced by Mannie Fresh
Albums produced by Mike Dean (record producer)
Albums produced by Mike Will Made It
Albums produced by Illmind
Albums produced by Tommy Brown (record producer)
Albums produced by Travis Scott
Albums produced by Young Chop
Big Sean albums
Common (rapper) compilation albums
Def Jam Recordings compilation albums
D'banj albums
GOOD Music albums
Hip hop compilation albums
John Legend albums
Kanye West albums
Kid Cudi albums
Teyana Taylor albums
Pusha T albums
Record label compilation albums